Serhii Ihorovych Parkhomenko (January 14, 1997, Kharkiv —  May 14, 2022, Huliaipole, Zaporizhzhia Oblast) was a Ukrainian military serviceman, captain of the Armed Forces of Ukraine, participant in the Russian-Ukrainian war. In August 2022, he was posthumously awarded the title of "Hero of Ukraine".

Biography 
He was born on January 14, 1997, in the city of Kharkiv, in a family of military aviators. Since childhood, he dreamed of the sky and wanted to connect his life with aviation. He graduated from the Ivan Bohun Kyiv Military Lyceum.

At the time when his father Ihor Parkhomenko was performing combat missions in the air during the war in Donbas in 2014, Serhiy entered the flight faculty of the Ivan Kozhedub National Technical University, which he successfully graduated in 2019, having obtained the qualification of a 3rd class pilot.

Following the example of his father and grandfather, Serhii expressed a desire to serve in the tactical aviation brigade named after Lieutenant General Vasyl Nikiforov and to fly Su-25 aircraft. Despite his young age, at the time of the Russian invasion of Ukraine, he already held the position of commander of the aviation unit. Since the first day of repelling the Russian invasion of Ukraine, he carried out 38 sorties in difficult conditions with enemy air defense and fighter aircraft, during which he destroyed more than 20 enemy tanks, more than 50 armored combat vehicles, 55 vehicles, 20 fuel tanks and several hundred Russian soldiers and officers.

On May 14, 2022, Captain Serhiy Parkhomenko died while performing a combat mission in the Zaporizhzhia region near the city of Huliaipole.

Since active hostilities were ongoing in the region where Parkhomenko came from, on May 18, 2022, he was buried in Vinnytsia.

He was survived by his parents, wife and son, who was born in March 2022.

Awards 

 the title of Hero of Ukraine with the award of the «Golden Star» order (May 20, 2022, posthumously) — for personal courage and heroism, shown in the defense of state sovereignty and territorial integrity of Ukraine, loyalty to the military oath.
 Order of Bohdan Khmelnytskyi III Class (May 2, 2022) — for personal courage and selfless actions shown in the defense of state sovereignty and territorial integrity of Ukraine, loyalty to the military oath.

Notes

Sources 

 Anastasia Olekhnovich, Two months before his death, Hero of Ukraine Serhiy Parkhomenko became a father… // ArmiyaInform. — 2022. — May 21.

1997 births
2022 deaths
Military personnel from Kharkiv
Ukrainian military personnel killed in the 2022 Russian invasion of Ukraine
Recipients of the title of Hero of Ukraine
Ukrainian Air Force officers